The U.S. Weather Bureau Station is an historic former weather station on Beach Avenue on Block Island, Rhode Island.  It is a two-story wood-frame structure, three bays wide, with a flat roof surrounded by a low balustrade.  There is a full-width porch across the front, supported by grouped columns.  The Classical Revival building was designed by Harding & Upman, and constructed in 1903, replacing a station destroyed by fire the previous year.  It originally had meteorological instruments mounted on the roof and the grounds, and was used as a weather station until 1950.  It was then converted for use as a summer tourist residence.

It was added to the National Register of Historic Places in 1983.

See also 

 National Register of Historic Places listings in Washington County, Rhode Island

References

New Shoreham, Rhode Island
Buildings and structures in Washington County, Rhode Island
Government buildings completed in 1903
Government buildings on the National Register of Historic Places in Rhode Island
National Register of Historic Places in Washington County, Rhode Island
Victorian architecture in Rhode Island
1903 establishments in Rhode Island